Efunsetan Aniwura is a  2005 Nigerian historical film about a heroine based in Abeokuta. it was produced by Funmi holder, directed by Tunde Kilani, and written by Akinwunmi Ishola.

Premier 
The film premiered 31 January 2005 in Cinemas.

Cast 
Kareem Adepoju
Said balogun
Deji Aderemi
Iyabo Ogunsola as Efunsetan Aniwura
Kola Oyewo
Jinadu Ewele
Laide Adewale

Synopsis 
Efunsetan Aniwura loses her child after struggling to be a successful woman, as a custodian of many slaves. This leads to her being harsh on them and no one can withstand her heartlessness. After some years, she commits suicide.

Award 
The film was nominated for Best International Narrative at the Annual ABFF Jury Awards.

See also 
 Akinwunmi isola
 Efunsetan Aniwura
 Koseegbe

References 

2005 films
Nigerian historical films
Nigerian drama films